Hieracium sprucei is a species of flowering plant in the family Asteraceae that is endemic to Ecuador.

References

sprucei
Endemic flora of Ecuador
Data deficient plants
Taxonomy articles created by Polbot